Adam Scut (fl. 1382–1401) of Exeter, Devon, was an English politician.

He was a Member (MP) of the Parliament of England for Exeter in May 1382, April 1384 and 1401. He was Mayor of Exeter 1385–6, 1397–8, 1407–8 and 1411–12.

References

14th-century births
15th-century deaths
Mayors of Exeter
English MPs May 1382
English MPs April 1384
Members of the Parliament of England (pre-1707) for Exeter
English MPs 1401